Bryukhankov is a Russian surname. Notable people with the surname include:

 Alexander Bryukhankov (born 1987), Russian triathlete
 Andrey Bryukhankov (born 1991), Russian triathlete, brother of Alexander

Russian-language surnames